Collagen induction therapy (CIT), also known as microneedling, dermarolling, or skin needling, is a cosmetic procedure that involves repeatedly puncturing the skin with tiny, sterile needles (microneedling the skin). CIT should be separated from other contexts in which microneedling devices are used on the skin (e.g., transdermal drug delivery, vaccination).

It is a technique for which research is ongoing, but has been used for a number of skin problems including scarring and acne. Some studies have also shown that, when combined with minoxidil treatment, microneedling is able to treat hair loss more effectively than minoxidil treatment alone.

Platelet-rich plasma (PRP) can be combined with collagen induction therapy treatment in a form of dermatologic autologous blood therapy. PRP is derived from the patient's own blood and may contain growth factors that increase collagen production. It can be applied topically to the entire treatment area during and after collagen induction therapy treatments or injected intradermally to scars. Efficacy of the combined treatments remains in question pending scientific studies. 

More serious safety concerns have been cited for these treatments, popularly known as vampire facials, when performed in non-medical settings by people untrained in infection control. The New Mexico Department of Health issued a statement that at least one such business offering vampire facials "could potentially spread blood-borne infections such as HIV, hepatitis B and hepatitis C to clients".

Notes

References
 
 
 
J Cosmet Dermatol, 15: 434-443. doi:10.1111/jocd.12207

Cosmetic surgery
Skin care